The Monarch Beverage Company Inc is a diversified, international beverage company based in Atlanta, Georgia.  The company's CEO is Jacques Bombal. The company was founded in 1965 by Frank Armstrong. Monarch Beverage Company aimed to establish itself by offering lesser-known soft drink brands that had strong regional sales and appeal. Monarch Beverage Company purchased Dad's Root Beer product line from IC Industries of Chicago in 1986.  Around that time, it was the second largest volume (12 million cases) root beer brand and was distributed by the Coca-Cola bottler network.  In 2007, The Dad's Root Beer Company, LLC of Jasper, Indiana, acquired the Dad's Root Beer brand as well as the rights to Bubble Up, Dr. Wells and Sun Crest in the U.S. and some other countries from The Monarch Beverage Co. of Atlanta.

Monarch Beverages is now concentrated on international markets where it does 90% of its business with brands like Kickapoo Joy Juice, and its outside-U.S. ownership of Bubble Up and Sun Crest.

Brands
Acute Fruit
American Cola
Bubble Up (International rights only)
COMOTION
Kickapoo Joy Juice
Mason's Root Beer
Nesbitt's (International rights only)
NTrinsic
Planet Cola (and other flavors)
Rush Energy Drink
Reaktor Energy
Sensa
Sun Crest (International rights only)

Former brands
All Sport (2001–2007)
Bubble Up (1978–2007) 
Chocolate Soldier (1966–1988)
Dad's Root Beer (1986–2007)
Dr. Wells (1987–2007) 
Frostie Root Beer (1980–2000) 
Grapette (and Orangette) (1977–2000) (was never marketed) 
Kist (1966–1997) 
Moxie (1966–2007) 
Nesbitt's (1975–1999) 
NuGrape (1968–1999) 
Quench
Sun Crest (1968–2007)

References

External links

Monarch Beverage Company website

Drink companies of the United States
Manufacturing companies based in Atlanta

Food and drink companies based in Atlanta
American companies established in 1965
Food and drink companies established in 1965